David Kudelka (born 8 March 1975) is a Czech former professional ice hockey player who played with HC Slovan Bratislava in the Slovak Extraliga.

References

External links

Living people
HC Slovan Bratislava players
1975 births
Czech ice hockey defencemen
People from Přerov
Sportspeople from the Olomouc Region
HC ZUBR Přerov players
MsHK Žilina players
Bakersfield Condors players
HC Oceláři Třinec players
HC Olomouc players
Rochester Americans players
EV Landshut players
Long Beach Ice Dogs (ECHL) players
Orli Znojmo players